Jägala Airfield (also Jägala Highway Strip) was an airfield in Jägala, Harju County, Estonia. The airfield was meant to be an emergency use airstrip for Soviet Air Force in case of war. In 1991 the airfield was abandoned, yet the airfield was used in 2016 by NATO aircraft during the exercise Saber Strike 16.

References

External links
  at Forgotten Airfields

Buildings and structures in Harju County
Defunct airports in Estonia
Jõelähtme Parish
Soviet Air Force bases